Roland Got (1916-1948) was a Chinese American character actor who worked in Hollywood during the 1930s and 1940s.

Biography 
Roland Got was born in San Francisco, California, in 1916 to William Got and Lilly Leong. His father, who immigrated from China, worked as a tailor, and his Chinese American mother was a seamstress. The family later moved to Los Angeles, where Roland and his siblings attended Jefferson High School. In L.A., Roland, a talented artist, also played on a semi-professional football team.

After high school, Got signed a contract with Metro-Goldwyn-Mayer and trained at the Motion Picture Academy. His big break came when he was cast in the 1937 film The Good Earth. He eventually appeared in nearly twenty films. He married Grace Chew, and together they had a daughter. His film career came to an end during World War II when he was drafted into the U.S. Army and sent to Europe.

After the war, Got began working in insurance sales. In late 1948, at the age of 32, he drowned after falling overboard from the ferry Sacramento while crossing San Francisco Bay. Roland Got was buried at Golden Gate National Cemetery in San Bruno, California.

Filmography

References 

American male film actors
American male actors of Chinese descent
1916 births
1948 deaths
Male actors from San Francisco
20th-century American male actors